The Nord 1601 was a French aerodynamic research aircraft designed and built by Nord Aviation. The aircraft was designed to investigate the aerodynamics of swept wings and related high-lift devices.

Design and development
The 1601 was a cantilever mid-wing monoplane with a 33° swept wing. The wing was fitted with ailerons, spoilers, leading edge 
slats and trailing edge flaps. It had  retractable tricycle landing gear and was powered by two Rolls-Royce Derwent turbojets in underslung, wing mounted nacelles on either side of the fuselage. It had an enclosed cockpit and was fitted with a Martin-Baker ejection seat. The 1601, registered F-WFKK, first flew on the 24 January 1950.

Variants
Nord 1600
Proposed fighter variant, not built.
Nord 1601
Aerodynamic research aircraft, one built.

Specifications (1601)

References

Bibliography

1950s French experimental aircraft
1601
Twinjets
Mid-wing aircraft
Aircraft first flown in 1950